Bruce Allan Laird (born May 23, 1950) is a former American football player who played in the National Football League (NFL) and in the United States Football League (USFL). He played college football at American International College. 

Laird played as strong safety and return specialist with the Baltimore Colts from 1972–1981, then for the San Diego Chargers for two seasons, before moving to the USFL after the 1983 season. Over Bruce's 12 year NFL career he started in 127 games, and played in a total of 164 games.

The first half of his career, Laird was a special teams punt and kick returner. Although he never returned one for a touchdown, he accumulated 3,748 yards in 213 attempts, with a career long of 73 yards. His average punt return was 6.6 yards per attempt, and he averaged 24.7 yards per kick return attempt.

Early years
Bruce Allan Laird was born  May 23, 1950 in Lowell, Massachusetts.  He moved to the coast, and attended Scituate High School where he was a four-sports star.

College years
Laird attended American International College, where he was an All-American his junior and senior years.  He graduated with dual degrees in history and political science.

Later years
After Bruce's final season with the NFL, he played in the USFL for the Arizona Wranglers and Arizona Outlaws.

Once retired from the game, Laird remained active with the NFL, as a member of the Board of Directors of "Fourth & Goal",  an independent organization for the benefit of retired NFL players.

Laird currently works as a senior marketing executive for a medical practice, Multi-Specialty HealthCare, and resides in the Baltimore metropolitan area, with his second wife, Mary, and his three sons from his first wife. He has also been the NFL's uniform inspector for Baltimore Ravens home games at M&T Bank Stadium since 1998.

References

1950 births
Living people
Sportspeople from Lowell, Massachusetts
American football safeties
American International Yellow Jackets football players
Baltimore Colts players
San Diego Chargers players
American Conference Pro Bowl players
Arizona Wranglers players
Arizona Outlaws players